The Trebouxiophyceae are a class of green algae, in the division Chlorophyta. Their circumscription within the green algae is not well established due to the need for more genetic studies at higher levels within the group.

Genera without intervening taxonomy include:
 Choricystis
 Crucigenia
 Koliellopsis
 Leptosira
 Rhopalosolen
 Viridiella
 Prototheca

See also 
List of Trebouxiophyceae genera

References

 
Green algae classes

it is also the very well-known album by WUDU SJON